Louis Gustave Bouchereau (20 June 1835, Montrichard – 22 February 1900, Paris) was a French psychiatrist.

He studied medicine in Paris, becoming a hospital externe in 1859, followed by an internship in 1863. In Paris he had as instructors Jean-Pierre Falret, Jules Baillarger, Jean-Martin Charcot and Alfred Vulpian. In 1866 he obtained his medical doctorate with a thesis on old hemiplegia, Des Hémiplégies anciennes. Soon afterwards, he was co-appointed with Valentin Magnan (1835–1916) to the Sainte-Anne asylum in Paris. In 1879 he succeeded Prosper Lucas (1805–1885) as superintendent of the women's division at Sainte-Anne.

Bouchereau served in a field hospital during the Franco-Prussian War. He was wounded at the Battle of Châtillon, subsequently being awarded with the badge of the Legion of Honour for gallantry and devotion. In 1871 he became a member of the Société Médico-Psychologique of Paris, being elected its president in 1891. For many years he served as general secretary of the Association mutuelle des médecins aliénistes de France.

Publications 
 Statistique des malades entrés en 1870 et en 1871 au bureau d'admission des aliénés de la Seine, with Valentin Magnan / Paris : Impr. de E. Donnaud, 1872.

Notes

References 
 The Journal of mental science, Volume 46 by Association of Medical Officers of Asylums and Hospitals for the Insane (London, England), Medico-psychological Association of Great Britain and Ireland, Royal Medico-psychological Association (biography)

French psychiatrists
1900 deaths
1835 births
People from Loir-et-Cher